Custer is an unincorporated community located in the town of Stockton, in Portage County, Wisconsin, United States.

History
The origin of the communities name is not confirmed but general consensus is it was named after Lt. Col. George Armstrong Custer, who was defeated during the battle of the Little Big Horn in 1876. The Custer post office was established in December, 1876 just six months after the battle of Little Big Horn. The community was originally called "Dawson". The only evidence to where this name came from was an August 8, 1854 land deed marking the sale of a large chunk of land in the area near the St. Mary's Church to a Michael Dawson. There is no biographical information about him in St. Mary’s documents, though there was a Michael Dawson that was elected to the town of Hull Board in 1859 and to the town of Sharon Board in 1860.

Geography
Custer is located in central Wisconsin approximately halfway between Stevens Point, and Amherst.

Economy
Custer is the host site of the annual Renewable Energy and Sustainable Living Fair sponsored by the Midwest Renewable Energy Association. Custer has a post office designated by the zip code 54423.

Notable people
 Janel McCarville, basketball player - WNBA Minnesota Lynx.
 James Miller, murdered Christian Brother

References

External links

Unincorporated communities in Wisconsin
Unincorporated communities in Portage County, Wisconsin